Shyroke is a settlement (posyolok) in Bashtanka Raion (district) in Mykolaiv Oblast of southern Ukraine, at about  east-northeast from the centre of Mykolaiv city. It hosts the administration of Shyroke rural hromada, one of the hromadas of Ukraine. 

Until 18 July 2020, Shyroke belonged to Snihurivka Raion. The raion was abolished that day as part of the administrative reform of Ukraine, which reduced the number of raions of Mykolaiv Oblast to four. The area of Snihurivka Raion was merged into Bashtanka Raion.

The settlement came under attack by Russian forces in 2022, during the Russian invasion of Ukraine.

References

Rural settlements in Mykolaiv Oblast